The Order of Merit of the Bavarian Crown was an order of merit of the Kingdom of Bavaria established by King Maximilian Joseph I on 19 March 1808. The motto of the order is Virtus et Honos ('Courage and Honour').

The order was awarded in several grades: 
 Grand Cross
 Grand Commander
 Commander
 Knight
 Medal in Gold
 Medal in Silver

History
King Maximilian I Joseph, founded the order to reward civil servants of the state of all classes and other foreigners who were deserving of recognition of the Kingdom of Bavaria. It was created as a civil counterpart to the Military Order of Max Joseph. Both the orders brought non-noble recipients in the collection of personal nobility with the title "Ritter von".

The Order of Merit of the Bavarian crown was initially founded with three grades Grand Cross, Commander, and Knight. King Maximilian II added the grade of Grand Commander in 1855. For each grade there was a fixed number of members. Initially membership in the order was limited to 12 Grand Crosses, 24 Commanders and 100 Knights. Statutes of the order from October 1817 list the limits at 24, 40 and 160. Adjustments to the statutes were also made on 16 February 1824, on 12 October 1834, on 12 January 1835 and in October 1838. The statutes were further modified in 1855 for the addition of the Grand Commander grade, also limited in numbers.

Recipients 

 Alfred, 2nd Prince of Montenuovo
 Johann Baptist Ritter von Bar (Königs Hofjägermeister)  
 Bernhard von Bülow
 Bruno, Prince of Ysenburg and Büdingen
 Chlodwig, Prince of Hohenlohe-Schillingsfürst
 Frederick, Prince of Hohenzollern
 Josef Ritter von Schmitt
 Gottfried Ritter von Schmitt
 Georg von Hauberrisser
 Heinrich VII, Prince Reuss of Köstritz
 Hermann, Fürst von Pückler-Muskau
 Georg von Hertling
 Heinrich von Heß
 Prince Karl Theodor of Bavaria
 Konstantin of Hohenlohe-Schillingsfürst
 Maximilian Karl Lamoral O'Donnell
 Leopold I of Belgium
 Ludwig I of Bavaria
 Johannes von Miquel
 August Ludwig von Nostitz
 Baron Karl Ludwig von der Pfordten
 Philipp, Prince of Eulenburg
 Albrecht von Roon
 Prince Rudolf of Liechtenstein
 Franz Xaver von Schönwerth
 Otto Graf zu Stolberg-Wernigerode
 Ludwig Freiherr von und zu der Tann-Rathsamhausen
 Johann Nepomuk von Triva
 Illarion Vorontsov-Dashkov
 Harald Nicolai Storm Wergeland

References

Orders of chivalry of Germany
Orders, decorations, and medals of Bavaria
1808 establishments in Bavaria
Awards established in 1808
Orders of merit